Pobre juventud (English title: Poor Youth) is a Mexican telenovela produced by Carla Estrada for Televisa in 1986. It is from an original story by Félix B. Caignet, adapted  by Marcia del Río and directed by Pedro Damián.

Jaime Moreno and Gabriela Roel starred as adult protagonists, while Alberto Mayagoitia and Patricia Pereyra starred as young protagonists.

Plot
Jorge is a rebellious and troubled young man who becomes interned in a reformatory where he discovers many of his colleagues in the same predicament, including Ponchado, Freddy, Muelas, El Chino and El Ruso. They all suffer cruelty and maltreatment at the hands of Remigio and Antonio, the sadistic guards.

Rosario, who works as a nurse at the reformatory, is a courageous young woman who is strongly opposed to the mistreatment and abuse daily dished out to the boys. Due to her kindness and great sense of justice, Rosario wins the sympathy of the delinquents there.

Jorge is a disturbed delinquent owing to the lack of affection at home, where he lives with his drunken father Evaristo, who only passes the time in an alcoholic stupor. On the other hand, there is Eduardo, a father/widower who mourns his only son Miguel, who died in an accident and who lives with his mother Eugenia.

 One day Jorge and Ponchado decide to escape the harsh environment of the reformatory, masquerading as doctors. Jorge flees to the neighborhood where he lives, soliciting help from his neighbor, Teresa. Confronting Evaristo and asking him to take her son once and for all, the man becomes angry and denies Jorge is his own son, thus revealing that Jorge was adopted.

Then the vengeful man goes to the reformatory and claims that George (Jorge) is in the vicinity. Teresa gives money to the boy to flee and be saved. Evading the police, Jorge decides to hide in  Eduardo's house by climbing the wall. Eduardo finds out, and also notices the huge resemblance to Michael, who he hides in his house.

 Jorge Anselmo quickly befriends the family butler, but Eugenia turns reproachful, saying it is unacceptable that "a disgusting boy" is allowed to live at home.

Rosario does not support the sordid atmosphere of the reformatory and thanks to the help of Dr. Alberto Junquera resigns and goes to work in his office. Soon thereafter, she meets Eduardo and falls 💘 in love with him. Meanwhile, Jorge suffers the death of his girlfriend, Chelito from leukemia, but finds love again in Alejandra, eventually discovering the truth about his origins.

Cast 
 
Jaime Moreno as Eduardo de la Peña
Gabriela Roel as Rosario
Alberto Mayagoitia as Jorge/Miguel de la Peña
Patricia Pereyra as Alejandra
Roberto Ballesteros as Néstor de la Peña
Antonio Brillas as Matías
Raúl Buenfil as Ponchado
Lolita Cortés as Rebeca
Ernesto Laguardia as Sergio "Muelas"
Sebastián Ligarde as Freddy
Irma Lozano as Josefina
Bertha Moss as Eugenia de la Peña
Guillermo Murray as Pablo
René Muñoz as Anselmo
Eugenia Avendaño as Magdalena
Liliana Weimer as Rosina
Manuel Guizar as Antonio
Ana María Aguirre as Marina
Mario García Gonzalez as Evaristo
Moreno López as Higinio
Arturo Lorca as Luis
Mauricio Ferrari as Gustavo
Eduardo Díaz Reyna as Flores
Victor Vera as Teniente Verane
Nailea Norvind as Gaby
Mapy Cortés as Gabriela
Luz Elena Silva as Martha
Meche Barba as Elvira
Ada Carrasco as Filomena
Aurora Alonso as Casilda
Maritza Olivares as Lupita
Wally Barrón as Remigio
Claudia Herfer as Chelito
Gloria Alicia Inclán as Teresa
Agustín López Zavala as Dr. Alberto Junquera
Jorge Santos as Carlos
Erika Magnus
Chayanne as Rafael "El Ruso"
Raúl Boxer as El Chino
Rodolfo de Alejandre
Octavio "Famoso" Gómez
Estela Barona
Mario del Río
Eugenio Cobo
Alicia Fahr
Rafael del Villar

Awards

References

External links

1986 telenovelas
Mexican telenovelas
1986 Mexican television series debuts
1987 Mexican television series endings
Spanish-language telenovelas
Television shows set in Mexico City
Televisa telenovelas